Meshkovoye is a rural locality (a selo) in Shebekinsky District, Belgorod Oblast, Russia. The population was 528 as of 2010. There are 5 streets in the locality.

Geography 
Meshkovoye is located 51 km northeast of Shebekino (the district's administrative centre) by road. Babenkov is the nearest rural locality.

References 

Rural localities in Shebekinsky District